Mehmet Kumova (born 1 December 1952) is a Turkish boxer. He competed in the men's bantamweight event at the 1972 Summer Olympics. At the 1972 Summer Olympics, he lost to Mayaki Seydou of Niger.

References

External links
 

1952 births
Living people
Turkish male boxers
Olympic boxers of Turkey
Boxers at the 1972 Summer Olympics
Sportspeople from Konya
Mediterranean Games gold medalists for Turkey
Mediterranean Games medalists in boxing
Competitors at the 1971 Mediterranean Games
Bantamweight boxers
20th-century Turkish people